The 1923–24 season was the 47th Scottish football season in which Dumbarton competed at national level, entering the Scottish Football League and the Scottish Cup. In addition Dumbarton played in the Dumbartonshire Cup.

Scottish League

With a second successive season in the Second Division, Dumbarton looked to push once more for a promotion place but by the turn of the year they were languishing in 17th place and threatened with relegation to the Third Division. Nevertheless an unbeaten 10 match run took them to 7th - but a promotion was never a reality and a 10th place finish was achieved, out of 20, with 39 points - 17 behind champions St Johnstone

Scottish Cup

For the third season in a row, Dumbarton were knocked out in the first round, this time by Aberdeen.

Dumbartonshire Cup
The county cup reverted to knock out format and Dumbarton lost in the first round to Clydebank, after a replay.

Friendlies
Three 'friendly' matches were played, winning 1 and losing 2, scoring 4 goals for the loss of 7.

Player statistics

Squad 

|}

Source:

Transfers

Players in

Players out 

In addition McGoldrick and Cairns (St Roch's), Beattie (Vale of Leven), and Alex Murray, James Warden, Harper and Alexander Hunter all played as 'trialists'.

Source:

References

Dumbarton F.C. seasons
Scottish football clubs 1923–24 season